Nesioneta is a genus of dwarf spiders that was first described by J. A. Beatty, J. W. Berry & Alfred Frank Millidge in 1991.

Species
 it contains nine species:
Nesioneta arabica Tanasevitch, 2010 – United Arab Emirates
Nesioneta benoiti (van Helsdingen, 1978) – Sri Lanka, Seychelles
Nesioneta elegans Millidge, 1991 – Caroline Is., Fiji
Nesioneta ellipsoidalis Tu & Li, 2006 – Vietnam
Nesioneta lepida Millidge, 1991 (type) – Marshall Is., Caroline Is., Hawaii
Nesioneta muriensis (Wunderlich, 1983) – Nepal
Nesioneta pacificana (Berland, 1935) – Pacific Is.
Nesioneta similis Millidge, 1991 – Caroline Is.
Nesioneta sola (Millidge & Russell-Smith, 1992) – Indonesia (Sulawesi)

See also
 List of Linyphiidae species (I–P)

References

Araneomorphae genera
Linyphiidae
Spiders of Asia